One Voice is the fourth full-length studio album from New York hardcore band Agnostic Front. It was released in 1992 on Relativity Records. It marks a three-year absence from recording – the last album was Live at CBGB in 1989 – after Roger Miret's term of imprisonment. However, the comeback was short-lived as after Last Warning (another live album), the band split up and did not record again until 1998.

Musically, the band continued their lean towards crossover thrash which earned the interest of Roadrunner Records who distributed this and their next album under license. After a three-year lay off,  two line-up changes had taken place – Matt Henderson replacing Steve Martin on guitar, and Craig Setari replacing Al Peters on Bass.

Track listing

Personnel
Agnostic Front
 Roger Miret – vocals
 Vinnie Stigma – lead guitar
 Matt Henderson – rhythm guitar
 Craig Setari – bass
 Will Shepler – drums
Production
 Armand Majidi – backing vocals
 Jamie Locke – piano
 Produced by Don Fury
 Engineered and mixed by Jamie Locke
 Assistant engineered by Joe Pires

References

External links
Flex! Discography album entry
Discogs album entry

1992 albums
Agnostic Front albums
Albums produced by Don Fury
Roadrunner Records albums